Adam Dickinson is a Canadian poet. He is most noted for his 2013 poetry collection The Polymers, which was a shortlisted finalist for the Governor General's Award for English-language poetry at the 2013 Governor General's Awards, for the 2014 ReLit Award for Poetry and for the 2014 Trillium Book Award.

A graduate of the University of Ottawa, University of New Brunswick and the University of Alberta, he teaches English literature at Brock University.

Works
Cartography and Walking (2002)
Kingdom, Phylum (2006)
The Polymers (2013)
Anatomic (2018)

References

External links

21st-century Canadian poets
Canadian male poets
University of New Brunswick alumni
University of Alberta alumni
Academic staff of Brock University
Writers from Ontario
People from Bracebridge, Ontario
Living people
21st-century Canadian male writers
Year of birth missing (living people)